Robert Williams (23 January 1811 – 7 June 1890) was a Conservative Party politician in the United Kingdom.

Early life
Williams was born on 23 January 1811.  He was the eldest son of the English banker and politician Robert Williams MP and the former Frances Turner of Putney. He later inherited the Bridehead estate near Dorchester, Dorset, his father purchased around 1797.

Career
He was elected as Member of Parliament (MP) for Dorchester at the 1835 general election, and held the seat until he stepped down from the House of Commons at the 1841 general election. In 1855 he was appointed Sheriff of Dorset.

Personal life
He had married twice: firstly to Mary Anne Cunningham, the daughter of Rev. John William Cunningham, the Vicar of Harrow, on 7 September 1847. Before her death on 1 September 1855, they had two sons and three daughters, including:

 Sir Robert Williams, 1st Baronet (1848–1943), who married Rosa Walker Simes, daughter of Nathaniel Simes.
 John Arthur Williams (1849–1892).

After the death of his first wife, he married, secondly, Lady Emily Maria Leslie-Melville (1815–1896) on 18 November 1858.  Lady Emily was the eldest daughter of John Leslie-Melville, 9th Earl of Leven and Harriet, Countess of Leven (a daughter of Samuel Thornton MP).

Williams died at Bridehead in Dorset in 1890. His widow, Lady Emily Williams, died on 10 March 1896.

Descendants
Through his son, Sir Robert, has a grandfather of Sir Philip Williams, 2nd Baronet (1884–1958), who married Margaret Peek, daughter of Sir Cuthbert Peek, 2nd Baronet and the former Hon. Augusta Louisa Brodrick (a daughter of William Brodrick, 8th Viscount Midleton).

References

External links 
 

1811 births
1890 deaths
Conservative Party (UK) MPs for English constituencies
UK MPs 1835–1837
UK MPs 1837–1841
High Sheriffs of Dorset